A candidate division, candidate phylum or candidate division-level is a lineage of prokaryotic organisms for which until recently no cultured representatives have been found, but evidence of the existence of the clade has been obtained by 16S rRNA and metagenomic analysis of environmental samples. The term candidatus in fact means a species for which there is insufficient information to call it a new species according to the International Code of Nomenclature of Bacteria

Examples of Candidate division bacteria

 Candidate division TM7 (Saccharibacteria)
 Poribacteria
 TG3 (candidate phylum) (Chitinivibrionia)

See also 
 Metagenomics
 Cloning
 DNA sequencing

References 

Candidatus taxa
Bacteria phyla
Archaea phyla